"Nota de Amor" ("Love Note") is a song by Puerto Rican rapper and singer Wisin and Colombian singer Carlos Vives, featuring fellow Puerto Rican rapper and singer Daddy Yankee. It was the lead single for Wisin's third studio album Los Vaqueros: La Trilogía (2015).

Charts

Weekly charts

Year-end charts

Certifications

See also
List of Billboard number-one Latin songs of 2015

References

2015 songs
2015 singles
Wisin songs
Carlos Vives songs
Daddy Yankee songs
Spanish-language songs
Sony Music Latin singles
Songs written by Andrés Castro
Songs written by Wisin
Songs written by Carlos Vives
Music videos directed by Jessy Terrero